James Caird may refer to:
 Sir James Caird (politician) (1816–1892), Scottish writer and politician
 Sir James Caird, 1st Baronet, of Belmont Castle (1837–1916), Scottish jute baron and philanthropist who sponsored Ernest Shackleton's Endurance Expedition
 Sir James Caird, 1st Baronet, of Glenfarquhar (1864–1954), Scottish shipowner, founder of the National Maritime Museum, Greenwich
 James Caird (boat), a whaleboat named after the jute baron, used by Sir Ernest Shackleton

See also
Caird (surname)

Caird, James